Macedonian studies  ( Makedonistika) is a science that studies the Macedonian language. A person who studies Macedonian is called a Macedonian specialist (Macedonian: Македонист / Makedonist).

Prominent Macedonian specialists
 Dalibor Brozović
 Petar Draganov 
 Victor Friedman
 Blaže Koneski (1921–1993)
 Christina Kramer 
 Horace Lunt
 Krste Petkov Misirkov
 Božidar Vidoeski (1920–1998)

See also
 Slavic studies
 Yugoslav studies

References